John Pearson may refer to:

Architects
 John Loughborough Pearson (1817–1897), British architect
 John A. Pearson (1867–1940), Canadian architect

Military
 John Pearson (VC) (1825–1892), recipient of the Victoria Cross
 John Andrew Pearson (Royal Navy officer), officer in the Royal Navy during the Second World War
 John William Pearson (1808–1864), captain in the Confederate Army during the American Civil War

Politicians
 John Pearson (politician) (1802–1875), American judge and politician
 John James Pearson (1800–1888), United States Congressman from Pennsylvania
 John L. Pearson (politician) (1926–2021), Mississippi state representative
 John Mills Pearson (1832–1910), American politician and Mason

Sports

Association football
 John Pearson (footballer, born 1868) (1868–1931), English football player and referee
 John Pearson (footballer, born 1892) (1892–1937), Scottish football player
 John Pearson (footballer, born 1896) (1896–1979), English football player
 John Pearson (footballer, born 1935), English football player
 John Pearson (footballer, born 1946), English football player
 John Pearson (footballer, born 1963), English football player

Other sports
 John Pearson (cricketer) (1915–2007), English cricketer
 John Pearson (curler) (active 1959), Scottish curler
 John Pearson (gymnast) (1902–1984), American gymnast
 John Pearson (sport shooter) (1926–1994), British Olympic shooter
 John Pearson, 3rd Viscount Cowdray (1910–1995), British peer, businessman and polo player

Others
 Norman Pearson (priest) (John Norman Pearson, 1787–1865), English divine
 John Pearson (artist) (fl. 1885–1910), English master-craftsman
 John Pearson (author) (1930–2021), British author 
 John Pearson (bishop) (1613–1686), English theologian, scholar, and Bishop of Chester
 John Pearson (judge) (1820–1886), British High Court justice and son of John Norman Pearson
 John Pearson (surgeon) (1758–1826), British surgeon
 John Pearson (advocate general) (1771–1841), Advocate General in British India
 John Richard Anthony Pearson, British chemical engineer
 John Thomas Pearson, British surgeon
 Johnny Pearson (1925–2011), British composer
 John Pearson (diplomat), British ambassador to Laos

See also
 Johnny Peirson (1925–2021), Canadian ice hockey player
 John Pierson (disambiguation)